Range is an unincorporated community in Range Township, Madison County, Ohio, United States.

The Range Post office was established on September 2, 1872, but was discontinued on December 14, 1905.  The mail service is now sent through the London branch. The community has also been listed on maps as Danville.

References 

Unincorporated communities in Madison County, Ohio
Unincorporated communities in Ohio